is a male badminton player from Japan.

Yamada played badminton at the 2000 Summer Olympics and 2004 Summer Olympics in men's singles, losing in the round of 32 to Taufik Hidayat of Indonesia in both times.

Link
2004 Japanese Olympic Committee

1976 births
Living people
Japanese male badminton players
Olympic badminton players of Japan
Badminton players at the 2004 Summer Olympics
Badminton players at the 2002 Asian Games
Badminton players at the 1998 Asian Games
Badminton players at the 2000 Summer Olympics
Asian Games competitors for Japan
21st-century Japanese people